D. Ray Heisey (1932–2011) was emeritus professor of intercultural communication at Kent State University.

Early life and education
Heisey was born in Gladwin, Michigan, and grew up in Louisville, Ohio. After attending Greenville College, Messiah College, Ohio State University, he started studying in a PhD program at Northwestern University.

Career

He taught for 8 years at Messiah College. As a professor at Kent State University, from 1966 until 1996, Heisey researched, taught and wrote about methods of communication and the differences between these in various cultures. Much of his research involved the role of rhetoric in cultural context. He also wrote and edited several books on this subject.

From Fall 1975 until 1978, Heisey served as the second president of Damavand College in Tehran, Iran. Heisey taught at Peking University in Beijing, China in 1996 and 2000. He was named visiting distinguished professor of rhetoric at Hiram College for 2008.

Heisey was presented with an outstanding paper award at the 1996 RIT Multiculturism, Cultural Diversity and Understanding Conference.

Heisey died May 20, 2011 of thyroid cancer in Cleveland, Ohio.

Family

Heisey married Susanne (née VanValin) in 1959. He had three sons. He was a member of the Kent Presbyterian Church in Kent, Ohio starting in 1968.

Books 

Wenshan Jia, D. Ray Heisey and Randy Kluver, editors. Chinese Communication Research in the 20th and 21st Centuries: Advances, Challenges and Prospects. JAI Press, 2000.

Articles 
"International Perspectives on Cultural Identity", Review of Communication, Volume 11, Issue 1, 2011 
 Heisey, D. R. (2011). Reflections on A Persian Jewel: Damavand College, Tehran (PDF)
 The Visual and Artistic Rhetoric of Americans and Iranians of Each Other Impacted by Media, D. Ray Heisey and Mansoureh Sharifzadeh]. in Proceedings of the Phi Beta Cappa, Volume 2 Number 1. (PDF)
"The Cross-Cultural Schemata of Iranian-American People Toward Each Other: A Qualitative Approach", Ehsan Shahghasemi and D. Ray Heisey. Intercultural Communications Studies, 2009, Volume XVIII Number 1

References

External links 
 International Perspectives on Cultural Identity
 D. Ray Heisey, Obituary |  Condolences
 Remembering D. Ray Heisey, by Mei Zhong (PDF)
 Professor 'D. Ray Heisey, The Full Moon of life' Written by Mansoureh Sharifzadeh, Tehran, Iran, July 2011, Medallion, page 12. (PDF)

1932 births
2011 deaths
Messiah University alumni
Ohio State University alumni
Kent State University faculty
American expatriates in Iran
Greenville College people
Northwestern University alumni
People from Gladwin, Michigan
People from Louisville, Ohio
American expatriate academics
Academic staff of Damavand College